Cahuac District is one of eight districts of the province Yarowilca in Peru.

References